Maksim Dmitriyevich Zhestkov (born 21 April 1993) is a Russian footballer.

Club career
He made his Russian Football National League debut for FC Mordovia Saransk on 9 July 2010 in a game against FC Volga Nizhny Novgorod.

External links
 
 

1993 births
People from Saransk
Living people
Russian footballers
Russia youth international footballers
Association football midfielders
FC Mordovia Saransk players
Russian expatriate footballers
Expatriate footballers in Portugal
S.C. Braga B players
FC Khimki players
FC KAMAZ Naberezhnye Chelny players
FC Mashuk-KMV Pyatigorsk players
Sportspeople from Mordovia